Stacia Fonseca (born September 21, 1985) is an American former professional tennis player.

The daughter of a minister, Fonseca was born in Springfield, Massachusetts, but grew up in Connecticut and Florida.

Fonseca made all of her WTA Tour main draw appearances in doubles and reached the quarter-finals at Cincinnati in 2005. Her only ITF title came in the doubles at the 2007 Hilton Head event.

ITF finals

Singles: 1 (0–1)

Doubles: 1 (1–0)

References

External links
 
 

1985 births
Living people
American female tennis players
Tennis people from Connecticut
21st-century American women